KBMV-FM (107.1 FM) is an American radio station broadcasting a Contemporary Christian music format. Licensed to Birch Tree, Missouri, the station is currently owned by E-Communications, LLC.

History
On August 1, 2011, Three Rivers Communications agreed to sell KBMV-FM and sister station KHOM (100.9 FM in Salem, Fulton County, Arkansas) to Diamond Media, LLC, for a reported combined sale price of $965,000.
On July 31, 2013, ownership of KHOM and KBMV changed to E-Communications, LLC, operator of KAMS and KALM-AM, for a purchase price of $550,000. As of August 25, 2013, KBMV airs the contemporary Christian format K-LOVE.

References

External links

K-LOVE Website

Shannon County, Missouri
K-Love radio stations
BMV-FM